The Olimpiyskiy National Sports Complex (also known as Olympic Stadium) is a multi-use sports and recreation facility in Kyiv, Ukraine, located on the slopes of the city's central Cherepanova Hora (Cherepanov Hill), Pecherskyi District. The Olympic National Sports Complex Stadium, the home of FC Dynamo Kyiv, is the premier sports venue in Ukraine and the sixteenth largest in Europe. Since May 2020, the stadium is also used for the home matches of Shakhtar Donetsk due to the war in Donbas. The complex beside its stadium also features several other sports facilities and is designed to host the Olympic Games (the stadium hosted some football matches at the 1980 Summer Olympics).

Following extensive renovation works, including the construction of a new roof, the stadium was reopened on 9 October 2011 with a performance by Shakira and had its international inauguration with a 3–3 friendly draw by Ukraine against Germany on 11 November 2011. It hosted the final of the UEFA Euro 2012 and the 2018 UEFA Champions League Final.

History

After Ukrainian independence in 1991, the stadium was given national status in 1996 and renamed again as the "Olympic" National Sports Complex. Kyivans still commonly refer to it as the Tsentralny (Central) or Respublykanskyi stadion (Republican Stadium), and the nearby metro station "Olimpiiska" that was also called "Respublykanskyi Stadion".

In 1997–99, the stadium was renovated again in accordance with FIFA guidelines, and its capacity was reduced to 83,450. The stadium continued to be the home ground of Dynamo with the Lobanovsky stadium serving as a training ground. Sometime after 1998 big changes took place as it was no longer efficient to keep and maintain the stadium as a club ground. Dynamo decided to reconstruct the Lobanovsky Dynamo Stadium as its primary ground because match attendances rarely exceeded 10,000 spectators. Since that time Olympic has been used primarily for football international matches and was lent to FC Dynamo Kyiv for high-profile home games when a high attendance was expected. However it is not the official home ground of Dynamo or any other Kyiv club, as they all have smaller home stadiums and training bases. The stadium is an official home ground of the Ukraine national football team and was the official venue of the Ukrainian Cup final until 2008. From 2008 Olympic underwent a major reconstruction in preparation for the continental championship.

Previous names
For most of its history the stadium was known as the Republican Stadium.
 1923–1924: Red Stadium named L. Trotsky
 1924–1935: Red Stadium
 1936–1938: Republican Stadium named S. Kosior
 1938–1941: Republican Stadium
 1941; 1943–1962: Republican Stadium named N. Khrushchev (50,000 capacity in 1941; reduced to 47,756 in 1944)
 Occupation by National Socialist Germany 1941–1943: All-Ukrainian Stadium
 1962–1979: Central Stadium (100,062 capacity in 1967)
 1980–1996: Republican Stadium
 1996–present: Olympic National Sports Complex (83,450 capacity in 1999; reduced to 70,050 in 2011)

1980 Summer Olympics

Three Group C and three Group D matches, as well as a quarter-final were scheduled for here, a total of seven games. In the first match on 20 July, East Germany tied with Spain by a scoreline of 1–1. The one quarterfinal, held on 27 July 1980, saw East Germany thrash Iraq by the record-breaking score of 4–0 on the way to their third title.

Matches at 1980 Summer Olympics

Euro 2012

On 18 April 2007, Poland and Ukraine were chosen by UEFA to co-host the finals of Euro 2012, with the Olimpiyskiy Stadium set to host the final. The reconstruction of the stadium involved the demolition and rebuilding of the lower tier, a completely new west stand with a two-level press box, luxury boxes between the two tiers, the addition of a 13-storey high-rise building to the west (to house the Sheraton Kyiv Olimpiysky Hotel), and the addition of a new roof (of unique design) covering the entire seating area. The capacity of the stadium after the reconstruction is 70,050. Reconstruction began on 1 December 2008, when the winner of a tender was announced. It was scheduled to be finished in 2011. The stadium was officially opened by Ukrainian President Viktor Yanukovych on 8 October 2011.

The three Group D matches involving Sweden, a quarter-final and the final were scheduled for here (with the other matches in Group D being played at the Donbass Arena). In the first match, Ukraine beat Sweden by a scoreline of 2–1. The final, held on 1 July 2012, saw Spain thrash Italy by the record-breaking score of 4–0 on the way to their third title.

Matches at Euro 2012

Concerts

When international music superstars or bands come to Kyiv, their concerts are often held in this stadium, as it is the biggest in Ukraine and one of the biggest in Europe. Artists to have performed here include George Michael and Shakira.

The Rolling Stones were scheduled to perform at the stadium on 25 July 2007 as part of their A Bigger Bang Tour, but the concert was moved to Warsaw, Poland because of political crisis and early parliament elections in Ukraine.

On 25 July 2012 was concert of world-famous rock-bands Red Hot Chili Peppers, Kasabian and The Vaccines.

Madonna performed a concert at the stadium on 4 August 2012 as part of her The MDNA Tour. 31,022 people visited her show.

Depeche Mode performed at the stadium on 29 June 2013 during their The Delta Machine Tour, in front of a crowd of 36,562 people.

Famous Ukrainian rock-band Okean Elzy performed and celebrate on the stadium their 20 anniversary on 21 June 2014. 71,045 people visited the show. The band again performed here the sold-out show on 18 June 2016 as a part of their 2016–2017 world tour.

Aerosmith were scheduled to perform at the stadium on 2 July 2014 as part of their Global Warming Tour, but the concert was cancelled due to Russian military intervention to Ukraine.

Adjacent infrastructure

Transportation
The stadium is located right in the centre of Kyiv on the right bank of the River Dnipro. The stadium can be approached mainly by either Velyka Vasylkivska Street or Lesi Ukrainki Boulevard. Both streets' southern ends connect to the European route E95, which is known at that part of the city as Druzhby Narodiv Boulevard. However the main arena of the complex does not have a direct access to the mentioned streets and can only be reached through several smaller streets such as Fizkultury, Saksahanskoho, Shota Rustaveli, Esplanadna Streets and Hospitalny Lane.

There are several subway stations on the Kyiv Metro located within walking distance: "Olimpiiska" (~) and "Palats Sportu" (~). These are usually closed during matches. It is possible to use other nearby stations Klovska, Zoloti Vorota, Teatralna, Palats "Ukrayina". In December 2010, Kyiv City State Administration renamed the subway station "Respublikansky Stadion" as "Olimpiiska".

Sports facilities
 National University of Ukraine on Physical Education and Sport
 House of Football
 Palace of Sports (indoor arena)
 Bannikov Stadium (Viktor Bannikov training complex)
 Atlet track and field training complex

Tourist attractions
 Hotels: Rus, President Hotel, Sheraton
 Kyiv Fortress National Park

Hospitals

See also
List of football stadiums in Ukraine

References

External links

 Journal of reconstruction «Olympic» NSC 
 Fairytales about logotypes of «Olympic» NSC 
 Atmosphere and Pictures from Olimpiyskiy
  Financial overview of construction (article)
  Location of the stadium on the META maps
 Web cameras:
 Top view
 Side view

Music venues completed in 1923
Olimpiyskyi
Sports venues in Kyiv
Athletics (track and field) venues in the Soviet Union
Olimpiyskyi
Olimpiyskyi
Ukraine
UEFA Euro 2012 stadiums in Ukraine
Olimpiyskyi
Olympic football venues
Tourist attractions in Kyiv
Gerkan, Marg and Partners buildings
Football venues in Kyiv
FC Dynamo Kyiv
Sports venues completed in 1923
Pecherskyi District
UEFA European Championship final stadiums
1923 establishments in Ukraine
Athletics in Kyiv